Dave Thomas (born 14 August 1988) is a New Zealand rugby union player. He plays in the wing (and occasionally centre or fullback) position for the provincial based ITM Cup side Northland and previously for Bay of Plenty and Auckland.

References

External links
 itsrugby.co.uk profile

1988 births
New Zealand rugby union players
Auckland rugby union players
Bay of Plenty rugby union players
Northland rugby union players
Rugby union wings
Living people